was a Japanese professional wrestler and karateka. He worked for numerous Japanese promotions for Frontier Martial-Arts Wrestling, New Japan Pro Wrestling, Pro Wrestling NOAH and many others.

Early life
Aoyagi was born in Kasuya District, Fukuoka, and raised in Toyota, Aichi. He was a swimmer while he was in elementary and junior high school, and was occasionally selected as a representative of the prefectural convention.

Professional wrestling career

Aoyagi started his professional wrestling debut in 1989. Early in his career Aoyagi worked for Wrestle Association-R from 1992 to 1994 and 1997 to 1998, Frontier Martial-Arts Wrestling from 1989 to 1994, and New Japan Pro Wrestling from 1990 to 1994.

In May 1994, when the World Wrestling Federation was on tour in Japan, Aoyagi wrestled a few matches for WWF. He defeated Bob Backlund on May 8 and later lost to Owen Hart and Bam Bam Bigelow.

In 2000, Aoyagi made his debut for the new promotion Pro Wrestling NOAH where he would work there until his retirement in 2015. 

On February 18, 2018, Aoyagi came out of retirement. He wrestled his last match on August 15, 2021.

Death
Aoyagi died on July 6, 2022. His death was announced by Pro Wrestling Zero1 the following day.

Championships and accomplishments
Daiwa Entertainment Pro Wrestling
	DEP Openweight Champion (1 time)
WAR
International Junior Heavyweight Tag Team Championship (1 time) – with Gokuaku Umibozu 
''Tokyo Sports
Newcomer Award (1990)
Best Tag Team Award (1992) – with Akitoshi Saito, Kengo Kimura and Shiro Koshinaka

References

1956 births
2022 deaths
Sportspeople from Fukuoka Prefecture
Japanese male professional wrestlers
Japanese male karateka
People from Aichi Prefecture
20th-century professional wrestlers
21st-century professional wrestlers
International Junior Heavyweight Tag Team Champions